Cephalopholis argus, the peacock hind, roi, bluespotted grouper, and celestial grouper, is a species of marine ray-finned fish, a member of the subfamily Epinephelinae, the groupers, and part of the family Serranidae, which also includes the anthias and sea basses. They come from the Indo-Pacific which is variously a commercial gamefish, an invasive species, and occasionally an aquarium resident. Its species name comes from its resemblance to the "hundred staring eyes" of the monster Argus in Greek mythology.

Description

Small individuals are dark brown with hundreds of small, dark-edged iridescent blue spots. Larger specimens sometimes develop four to six lighter vertical bars on the back half of its body.

Distribution and habitat
The species is extremely widely distributed, occurring in warm waters from the Red Sea to South Africa and east to French Polynesia and the Pitcairn group. It is also present in northern Australia, Lord Howe Island, and Japan, and has been introduced to the Hawaiian Islands. It makes use of a variety of habitats but prefers the exposed fronts of reefs, at depths of up to 40 m.

Ecology

Feeding
Hunting, they lie on the bottom and surge forward, preferring juvenile surgeonfish and crustaceans. Alternatively they may hover motionless in the water column before attacking.

This grouper may follow and cooperate with another predator species, such as an octopus or eel or camouflage themselves in a school of surgeonfish. Multiple individuals may cooperate to harass an eel to get it to flush prey for them.

In the Red Sea, they hunt in the morning and evening.

Behavior
The species typically sit on a coral head, retreating when startled.

Each female defends part of the territory from the other females. The male visits each female daily, raising his dorsal fin to signal his approach. The females emerges from hiding, erecting her own dorsal fin and changing to a lighter color. They swim together, rubbing flanks before he departs until the next day.

Territorial disputes may involve "color fights" in which two males positioning themselves at right angles to each other. They then darken their color and repeatedly switch their bars from dark to light. The loser becomes pale and retreats. If the color fight ends in a draw, the two males may attack each other.

Reproduction
In Micronesia, spawning usually occurs territorially at dusk. During courtship, both sexes darken except for a white keyhole-shaped patch at the center of the body.

In the aquarium
Cephalopholis argus is a hardy aquarium fish for those who have a large marine aquarium. Its large size combined with its aggressive nature means it is best housed either alone or with other large aggressive fish such as lionfish, and moray eels. As a predator it will eat any smaller aquarium inhabitants such as damselfish.

Introduced status in Hawaii
Known in Hawaii as roi, the state introduced the species in the 1950s to enhance local fisheries. Hawaii's Division of Aquatic Resources (DAR) finds that roi have become the reefs' dominant predator. The Roi population there has increased 15 fold since the 1980s. From 1999 to 2005 there was a 23% increase in their population. Their biomass is now greater than that of all other reef fish predators combined.

These predators threaten native reef fish such as parrotfish and goatfish. A University of Hawaii study estimated that in a three-square-mile area off the Kona Coast of Hawaii Island, Roi eat  of reef fish annually— equivalent to 8.2 million fish.

Ciguatera
Prized as delicious eating in other Pacific regions, in Hawaii's waters roi may contain the ciguatera toxin, which builds up in humans and causes serious illness. A study published in 2007 found that 18% of Roi sampled from Oahu and Hawaii islands had toxins above levels safe for consumption.  Due to high variability of toxin levels between individuals in the same area, toxicity cannot be predicted based on location. There is a weak correlation between the length of Roi and their toxicity, however, due to high variability, this is not a reliable predictor of toxicity. There is currently no commercially available testing kit. Because of the toxicity issues, Roi does not have a functional fishery, with just an average of $1000 per year in sales.

Diet
Analysis of stomach contents of Hawaiian roi found that diets consist of 97.7% fish and 2.3% crustaceans. Of the fish eaten, there were 27.1% Scaridae (Parrotfish), 18.7% Acanthuridae (Surgeonfish), 17.6% Squirrelfish, 13.7% Monacanthidae (Filefish), 9.3% Priacanthidae (Bigeyes), 4.3% Chaetodontidae (Butterflyfish), 2.8% Aulostomidae (Trumpetfishes), and 6.9% other consisting of 9 families. Roi are estimated to eat 0.8% of their body weight each day.

Impact
Roi feed primarily on juvenile fish that have recruited the reef. The family of fish that make up the majority of their diet Scaridae or Parrotfish, are crucial to the coral reef ecosystem by removing algal growth on coral colonies through feeding. Parrotfish also play a large role in the production of sand. Hawaii has the highest rate of endemism of its nearshore marine fish species at 24.3%. The lack of natural predators to control Roi populations along with their high efficiency is a major threat to the unique fish fauna found in Hawaii. Ichthyologist Dr. Jack Randall describes the impact of Roi in Hawaii as greater than the impact of fishing and aquarium collection combined. Estimates of consumption on the Kona coast suggest that Roi consume 11% of the total reef fish biomass and 72% of the total number of fish.

Roundups
On Maui, spearfishers participate in "Roi Roundup" tournaments that target these problematic fish, attempting to reduce their numbers and impact. This practice has spread to other islands, where there are similar tournaments that target roi and other invasive fish species. These events not only reduce the roi population, but also work to boost public awareness about this issue.

Conservation
The species is classified as Least Concern by the IUCN. and is widespread and common throughout its range. It is exploited in commercial and recreational fisheries and for the aquarium trade.

References

External links
Blue Spotted Grouper Species Profile :: AquariumDomain 
animal-world.com Page on blue-spotted grouper
fishbase Page on Cephalopholis argus
 

argus
Fish of Hawaii
Fish described in 1801